The Embassy of the Dominican Republic in London is the diplomatic mission of the Dominican Republic in the United Kingdom.

References

Other links
Official site

Dominican Republic
Diplomatic missions of the Dominican Republic
Dominican Republic–United Kingdom relations
Buildings and structures in the City of Westminster
Bayswater